Little Mill Creek is a  long 3rd order tributary to Christina River in New Castle County, Delaware.

Variant names
According to the Geographic Names Information System, it has also been known historically as:  
Mill Creek
Taswaijeeskil
Tesswijreskijl

Course
Little Mill Creek rises on the Brandywine Creek divide about 0.5 miles west of Greenville in New Castle County, Delaware.  Little Mill Creek then flows generally south to meet Christina River at Wilmington, Delaware.

Watershed
Little Mill Creek drains  of area, receives about 46.5 in/year of precipitation, has a topographic wetness index of 494.65 and is about 14% forested.

See also
List of rivers of Delaware

References 

Rivers of Delaware
Tributaries of the Christina River